Željko Joksimović (born 20 April 1972) is a Serbian vocalist, composer, songwriter, multi-instrumentalist and producer. He plays 12 different musical instruments including accordion, piano, guitar and drums. Joksimović is multi-lingual, being fluent in Greek, English, Russian, Polish and French as well as his native Serbian.

A singer-songwriter, Joksimović has been successful composing for other artists throughout the Balkans. He has written five ballads that have represented their respective countries at the Eurovision Song Contest: "Lane moje", "Lejla", "Oro", "Nije ljubav stvar" and "Adio". He also composes music for films, television series and theater shows. He represented Serbia and Montenegro in the Eurovision Song Contest 2004 with the song "Lane moje", placing second. He also represented Serbia in the Eurovision Song Contest 2012 with the song "Nije ljubav stvar", placing third.

During 2013, 2014 and 2015, he was a judge on X Factor Adria, the Western Balkan edition of The X Factor.

Career

Early beginnings
Željko Joksimović was born on 20 April 1972 in Belgrade and grew up in the city of Valjevo. Joksimović's family originates from the Vasojevići clan Željko's first international success came at the age of 12, when he won the title of First Accordion of Europe at the prestigious music festival in Paris. He graduated music at the University of Belgrade and launched his professional music career in 1997. In 1998 he won a contest at the Pjesma Mediterana festival with the song "Pesma Sirena", which led to opportunities to perform at more prestigious festivals in Belarus. The Serbian musician won the "Grand-Prix" award at two festivals in that country.

1999–2003: Amajlija, Rintam and 111
The young singer was promoted as a folk and pop artist. His first studio album, titled Amajlija, included "Pesma Sirena" along with seven other tracks. His first big success was with the single "7 godina", written by himself and Leontina Vukomanović. The song went to No. 1 on the Serbian pop music charts, and became very popular in other former Yugoslav countries.

In 1999 he won his first big prize when becoming the Grand Prix winner of the International Festival of Arts Slavianski Bazaar in Vitebsk, Belarus.

In 2001, Joksimović released his second studio album Vreteno named after a song on the album. Other tracks on the album included "Rintam", "Balada", "Gadura" and the duet with Haris Džinović "Šta će meni više od toga". Three music videos were produced for songs on this album.

111 was released in 2002, soaring to No.1 on the pop charts of Serbia and other countries of the region. Some of the songs included were "Varnice", "Zaboravljaš" and "Karavan".

In 2003, Joksimović wrote the song "Čija si" for Macedonian music singer Toše Proeski which led him to win Beovizija.

2004: Eurovision Song Contest 2004

Serbia and Montenegro, sending an entrant for the first time to 2004 Eurovision Song Contest, decided on their representative through Evropesma 2004, a music festival and contest in Serbia and Montenegro. Joksimović won the contest with "Lane Moje", composed by Željko himself, along with lyricist Leontina Vukomanović.

In the semi-final, Joksimović placed first. However, in the final he placed second behind Ukrainian singer Ruslana, but received the "Marcel Bezencon Press Award" (Best Composer Award). "Lane Moje" was the best selling single in Serbia and Montenegro.

The song has become popular amongst many Eurovision fans and it is often rated as one of the best non-winning songs.

2004–2007: After first Eurovision, IV and Platinum Collection

After the success in the Contest, the same year, Joksimović founded MINACORD PRODUCTION. Since then, he works and composes in his own studio. In 2007 he composed and released the single "Ledja o Ledja" which gained a large popularity over the countries where Željko usually performs. In 2005, he once again composed a song for Serbia and Montenegro's national pre-selection for Eurovision called Beovizija. Željko composed the ballad "Jutro" (Morning) which was performed by Jelena Tomašević. In October 2005, he composed and performed a duet with Austrian singer Tamee Harrison. The song was titled I Live my Life For You" which was a success throughout Europe. Around this time, Željko wrote his first film score. In cooperation with Cobra production he composed music for the movie Ivkova slava (Ivko's fame). The same year he released his fourth studio album "IV" or "Ima nešto u tom što me nećeš". In this album he changed the music style that was typical about him. The songs in the album are Pop ballads with some ethnic Serbian folk elements. In 2006, he composed the Eurovision Song Contest 2006 song Lejla for Bosnia and Herzegovina, performed by Hari Mata Hari. The song finished in third place, making it Bosnia's best performance in the contest. He also won the prestigious Best Composer Award (COMPOSERAWARD 2006), assigned to Željko by all composers who participated in that festival.

In 2007, he released his second greatest hits compilation called Platinum Collection which included two new singles "Devojka" and "Nije do mene". He also composed the music for the TV series "Ranjeni orao" and "Ono nase sto nekad bejase". The same year, in front of 18,000 people Joksimović made a concert where he sang all of his hits in the Belgrade Arena released in the DVD titled "Koncert Beogradska Arena".

2008–2011: Eurovision hosting and Ljubavi

In early 2008, Željko Joksimović composed a song that was performed by Jelena Tomašević in the Serbian national final for the Eurovision song selection, Beovizija 2008, called "Oro". The song is a folk ballad with traditional folk Serbian elements. Because the Eurovision Song Contest 2007 has been won by Serbia, the contest that year came in the country. On 24 March 2008 it was announced by the 2008 Eurovision organisers RTS that together with Jovana Janković he would host the Eurovision Song Contest 2008 in Belgrade, giving him two roles in the contest. Tomašević's song finished on the 6th place over 25 countries in the final.
The song came six with 160 points, with OGAE Greece ranking it as their favourite of the year.

After a year of a music pause he released his fifth studio album named Ljubavi (2009) by the production of Minacord and City Records. "Ljubavi" is the name of the pilot single of the album too. The single has a large success in Serbia and the neighbouring countries. In early 2010 he released the second single from the album called "Žena Za Sva Vremena".

On 12 June 2010, he performed his biggest concert yet. It was held on the Asim Ferhatović Hase Stadium in Sarajevo, Bosnia and Herzegovina, which can seat 37,500, though attendance for concerts can be expanded to reach about 80,000, in front of over 40,000 persons.

2012: Eurovision return
Joksimović represented Serbia in the Eurovision Song Contest 2012 in Baku, Azerbaijan. The song was called "Nije ljubav stvar" composed and performed by Joksimović. The lyrics are by Marina Tucaković and Miloš Roganović. The English version of the song called "Synonym" by Ljilja Jorgovanović. The arrangements of both versions were done by Željko Joksimović and Alek Alekov. The postproduction and mastering was done by James Cruz, an award-winning audio-mastering engineer in his New York studio. The song was a great success, finished on third place.

He married Jovana Janković in January 2012.

2015: Eurovision Song Contest 2015
Željko Joksimović was invited by RTCG to compose song for Knez who represented Montenegro in the Eurovision Song Contest 2015 in Vienna, Austria. Joksimović composed song Adio and the song has three versions, in Serbian, French and English language. Serbian lyrics are written by Marina Tucaković and Dejan Ivanović, while English version is signed by Swedish songwriters Nicole Rodriguez, Tami Rodriguez, and Serbian Milica Fajgelj and Dunja Vujadinović.

Recent concerts
In November 2018, Željko Joksimović had a concert in Arena Zenica – after eight-year break. He gave another concert entitled "Dva sveta" (Two worlds) in Sava Centar a month later.

On 9 August, Joksimović closed Zenica summer fest 2019 by free public two-hour performance on Zenica city square.

Discography

Studio albums
 1999 Amajlija [City Records]
 2001 Rintam [City Records]
 2002 111 [City Records]
 2005 Ima nešto u tom što me nećeš [City Records]
 2009 Ljubavi [Minacord]
 2015 Zvezda [Minacord]

Live albums
 2008  Beogradska Arena Live [Minacord Records]
 2017  Dva Sveta - Koncert Sava Centar (Live) [Minacord Records]

Compilations
 2003 The Best Of Željko Joksimović
 2007 Platinum Collection
 2010 Ultimate Collection

Singles
 2004 Leđa o leđa [City Records]
 2004 Lane moje CD+DVD [PGP RTS]
 2004 Lane moje/Goodbye (maxi-single) [Warner Music Group]
 2005 I live my life for you (with Tamee Harrison) [Warner Music]
 2007 Devojka [Minacord]
 2007 Nije do mene [Minacord]
 2008 Ono naše što nekad bejaše [Minacord]
 2010 Dođi sutra [Minacord]
 2012 Nije ljubav stvar [Minacord]
 2013 Ludak kao ja [Minacord]
 2015 Ranjena zver [Minacord]
 2017 Milimetar [Minacord]
 2018 Ponelo me [Minacord]
 2018 Menjaj pesmu [Minacord]
 2019 Možda je to ljubav [Minacord]

Duets
 2001 Haris Džinović – Šta će meni više od toga
 2004 Dino Merlin – Supermen
 2005 Tamee Harrison – I Live My Life For You
 2012 Samuel Cuenda " Su amor me venció"
 2009 Miligram - Libero
 2014 Daniel Kajmakoski – Skoplje - Beograd
 2014 Toni Cetinski – Zabluda
 2018 Emina Jahović – Dva aviona

Soundtracks
 2005 "Ivkova slava", (Željko Joksimović, Jelena Tomašević & Nikola Kojo) [Minacord – City Records]
 2009 "Ranjeni Orao" [Minacord – City Records]

Other works
 2003 Toše Proeski – Song: Cija Si – Composer: Željko Joksimović, Album: Den Za Nas/Dan Za Nas
 2005 Nava Medina – Song: Malah Shomer – Composer: Željko Joksimović
 2005 Jelena Tomasevic – Song: Jutro – Composer: Željko Joksimović, Album: Oro [PGP -RTS]
 2006 Hari Mata Hari – Song: Lejla – Composer: Željko Joksimović, Album: Lejla [BiH]
 2009 Halid Bešlić – Song: "Miljacka" – Composer: Željko Joksimović, Album: Halid 08 Bešlić
 2008 Jelena Tomasevic – Song: Oro – Composer: Željko Joksimović, Album: Oro [PGP -RTS]
 2008 Eleftheria Arvanitaki – Song: To Telos mas Des – Composer: Željko Joksimović, Album: Mirame Universal Music
 2008 Melina Aslanidou – Song: Poso – Composer: Željko Joksimović, Album: Best of – Sto dromo Sony BMG
2008 Song: Nikola Tesla (Instrumental) – Composer: Željko Joksimović feat. Jelena Tomašević Album: balkan Routes vol.1:Nikola Tesla[Protasis]
 2011 Lepa Brena – Song: Biber – Composer: Željko Joksimović
 2011 Lepa Brena – Song: Ne bih bila ja – Composer: Željko Joksimović
 2013 Saša Kapor – Song: Hotel Jugoslavija – Composer: Željko Joksimović
 2014 Knez – Song: Adio – Composer: Željko Joksimović

Eurovision Song Contest entries

Entries in Beovizija 
2003 - "Čija si" (Чија си) by Toše Proeski - 1st
2004 - "Zamisli" (Замисли) by Leontina Vukomanović - 3rd
2005 - "Jutro" (Јутро) by Jelena Tomašević - 1st
2008 - "Oro" (Оро) by Jelena Tomašević - 1st

Entries in Evropesma / Europjesma 
2004 - "Lane moje" (Лане моје) by Željko Joksimović - 1st
2004 - "Zamisli" (Замисли) by Leontina Vukomanović - 12th
2005 - "Jutro" (Јутро) by Jelena Tomašević - 2nd

See also
Music of Serbia
Evropesma
Serbia and Montenegro in the Eurovision Song Contest
Serbia in the Eurovision Song Contest
List of Eurovision Song Contest presenters
Ima nešto u tom što me nećeš

References

External links

 Željko Joksimović's Official website

1972 births
Living people
Serbian composers
English-language singers from Serbia
Eurovision Song Contest entrants for Serbia and Montenegro
Eurovision Song Contest entrants for Serbia
Eurovision Song Contest entrants of 2004
Eurovision Song Contest entrants of 2012
Musicians from Valjevo
Singers from Belgrade
21st-century Serbian male singers
Serbian folk-pop singers
Serbian pop singers
Serbian singer-songwriters
Hayat Production artists
Serbian multi-instrumentalists
21st-century multi-instrumentalists
Balkan Music Awards winners
Slavianski Bazaar winners
20th-century Serbian male singers